The Vault may refer to:

Music 
The Vault (Ashanti album), a 2009 album by singer Ashanti
The Vault (Cashis album), a 2011 EP by rapper Cashis 
The Vault (Ol' 55 album), a 1980 album by Australian band Ol' 55
The Vault: Old Friends 4 Sale, a 1999 album by Prince
 The archive of unreleased Prince projects popularly known as "The Vault"
The Vault, Vol. 1, a 2007 compilation album by American band Tabitha's Secret
The Vault, a 2011 mixtape/EP by rapper Cashis
The Vault, a 2018 EP by G-Eazy
The Vault (Sirius), a defunct music channel on Sirius Satellite Radio

Music television 
Trace Vault, a British music television channel formerly known as The Vault
The Vault, a former program on VH1 Classic in the US

Television 
The Vault (game show), a UK game show
"The Vault", an episode of Mission: Impossible
"The Vault", an episode of Adventure Time

Other media 
The Vault (wiki), a wiki for the Fallout video game series
The Vault, the bonus store in the video game Guitar Hero: Aerosmith
The Vault, a term used to refer video games included on the EA Access subscription service
The Vault (novel), a 2011 novel by Ruth Rendell
The Vault, a history blog of Slate (magazine)
The Vault (2017 film), a 2017 American film
The Vault (2021 film), a 2021 Spanish film

Other uses 
The Vault (Coffee Shop), an unmanned self-serve coffee shop in Valley City, North Dakota

See also
Vault (disambiguation)
From the Vault (disambiguation)